The Surutú River is a river in the Santa Cruz Department in Bolivia.

See also
List of rivers of Bolivia

References
Rand McNally, The New International Atlas, 1993.

Rivers of Santa Cruz Department (Bolivia)